A pachade, also known as a farinette, is a thick and crispy pancake which is traditionally eaten in the French region of Auvergne.

Recipe 
Pachade is prepared like a pancake. The recipe includes eggs, several tablespoons of wheat flour, salt and milk, mixed into a paste thicker than a typical pancake batter. Pachade may be sweet or savoury.

References

Bibliography 
 Marie-Aimée Méraville, Contes populaires de l'Auvergne, 1982, p.295

External links 
 Pachade recipes

Egg dishes
French cuisine
Pancakes